Larvik Airport, Fritzøe was a private airport situated at Yttersø in Larvik, Norway. Straddling the shore of the river of Numedalslågen, the airport featured a  grass runway. The airport was built in 1957.

History

The first aviation in Larvik was an air show held at Yttersø in 1914, on the site of the later airport. The first proposal for an airport in Larvik was carried out by the Luftwaffe during the German occupation of Norway. They commenced construction of an airport at Månejordet in Hedrum in January 1945, although this was never completed.

Larvik Airport, Fritzøe was built by the conglomerate Treschow–Fritzøe under the auspice of director Gerhard Aage Treschow. The site was located close to the company's head office. The only regular commercial flights out of the airport were carried out by Fjellfly. The used it to transport the newspaper Dagbladet to Larvik. The largest aircraft they used on this route was the Scottish Aviation Twin Pioneer.

Facilities

The aerodrome was situated on the western bank of Numedalslågen on the farm of Yttersø in Larvik. The airport featured a  grass runway, aligned 01/19. It also had a landslip for seaplanes to reach a water aerodrome on the river.

Accidents and incidents
A Cessna Skymaster slid off the runway into the river upon take-off on 15 August 1994. Although the aircraft was written off, the pilot was not injured.

References

Airports in Vestfold og Telemark
Water aerodromes in Norway
Defunct airports in Norway
Buildings and structures in Larvik
Airports established in 1957
1957 establishments in Norway